Bradley Mitchell Goode (born October 10, 1963, in Chicago) is an American jazz trumpeter, bassist, drummer, composer and music educator.

Career
Goode worked as a sideman with Eddie Harris, Ira Sullivan, Barrett Deems, Ernie Krivda, Jack DeJohnette, Von Freeman, Curtis Fuller, Sheila Jordan, and Paa Kow. He has led his own groups since 1982. He has been a member of the faculties of the American Conservatory of Music, The University of Cincinnati Conservatory of Music, Cuyahoga Community College, New Trier High School and the University of Colorado, where he has been Associate Professor of Jazz Studies. Goode has recorded for SteepleChase, Delmark, and Origin.

Goode graduated from East Lansing High School in Michigan in 1981. He received a degree in Music from the University of Kentucky in 1985, majoring in Trumpet Performance. He received an MM in Music from DePaul University in 1988, majoring in Bass Performance. His trumpet teachers include Vincent DiMartino, William Adam and Clark Terry. His bass teachers include Larry Gray and Donald Rafael Garrett.

Discography

As leader
 Shock of the New (Delmark, 1988)
 Brad Goode (SunLight, 1995)
 That Cowboy Jazz with Luke and the Cool Hands (SunLight, 1997)
 Toy Trumpet (SteepleChase, 2000)
 By Myself (SteepleChase, 2001)
 Inside Chicago Vol. 1 with Von Freeman (SteepleChase, 2001)
 Inside Chicago Vol. 2 with Von Freeman (SteepleChase, 2001)
 Inside Chicago Vol. 3 with Von Freeman (SteepleChase, 2002)
 Inside Chicago Vol. 4 with Von Freeman (SteepleChase, 2003)
 Hypnotic Suggestion (Delmark, 2006)
 Jam Session, vol. 17 with Ryan Kisor and John McNeil (SteepleChase, 2006)
 Nature Boy (Delmark, 2007)
 Polytonal Dance Party (Origin, 2008)
 Tight Like This (Delmark, 2010)
 Chicago Red (Origin, 2013)
 Montezuma (Origin, 2014)
 That's Right! (Origin, 2018)

As sideman
 Rony Barrak, Darbouka City (EMI, 2009)
 Richie Cole, The KUVO Sessions Vol. 2 (KUVO, 2008)
 Richie Cole, Mile Hi Madness (Akashic, 2015)
 Barrett Deems, How Do You Like It So Far? (Delmark, 1994)
 Matt Dusk, Live in Las Vegas (Capitol, 2010)
 Matt Dusk, My Funny Valentine (Koch, 2013)
 Matt Dusk, Old School Yule (Magic, 2016)
 Matt Dusk, Jet Set Jazz (Magic, 2018)
 Curtis Fuller, Up Jumped Spring (Delmark, 2004)
 Mandy Harvey, After You've Gone (2011)
 Fred Hess, Hold On (Dazzle, 2009)
 Fred Hess, Into the Open (Allison, 2010)
 Paa Kow, Hand Go Hand Come (2013)
 Paa Kow, Ask (2014)
 Paa Kow, Cook Pot (2017)
 Ernie Krivda, Perdido (Koch, 1997)
 Ernie Krivda, The Band That Swings (Koch, 1999)
 Mollie O'Brien, Saints and Sinners (Remington Road, 2010)
 Joanie Pallatto, Passing Tones (Southport, 1995)
 Sax Appeal, The Flatiron Suite (2006)
 Steve Vining, Telling Visions (CMN, 2002)

References
"Brad Goode". The New Grove Dictionary of Jazz. 2nd edition, ed. Barry Kernfeld.

1963 births
Living people
Musicians from Chicago
21st-century American male musicians
21st-century trumpeters
American jazz trumpeters
American male trumpeters
Jazz musicians from Illinois
American male jazz musicians